The sixth government of Israel was formed by Moshe Sharett during the second Knesset on 29 June 1955. Sharett dropped the General Zionists and the Progressive Party from his coalition, which included Mapai, Mizrachi, Hapoel HaMizrachi, the Democratic List for Israeli Arabs, Progress and Work and Agriculture and Development.

The only changes to the cabinet from the previous government were the dropping of General Zionist ministers Yosef Serlin, Israel Rokach and Yosef Sapir; instead of appointing new ministers to the cabinet to replace them, Sharett divided their portfolios out between existing ministers. Although his party departed from the coalition, Progressive Party MK Pinchas Rosen remained Minister of Justice.

With the exception of Deputy Minister Kalman Kahana who resigned on 15 August, the government remained in place until 3 November 1955, more than three months after the July 1955 elections.

External links
Second Knesset: Government 6

 06
1955 establishments in Israel
1955 disestablishments in Israel
Cabinets established in 1955
Cabinets disestablished in 1955
1955 in Israeli politics
 06